Ruth Sheldon (born 3 May 1980) is an English chess player.

She won the Under-14 Girls' World Youth Chess Championship in 1993, and the Under-18 Championship in 1998.

She played in the England women's team which won the bronze medal in the European Team Chess Championship in 1997, and took part in the 32nd Chess Olympiad.

She has a Ph. D. in sociology from the University of Kent, and is a lecturer in religion and social science at King's College London.

References

External links
chess games entry

English female chess players
1980 births
Living people
Place of birth missing (living people)